West Station is a planned station on the MBTA Commuter Rail Framingham/Worcester Line, to be located in the former Beacon Park Yard in Allston, Massachusetts. It was initially proposed as part of a project to straighten the Massachusetts Turnpike through the yard, allowing much of the land to be redeveloped. Initially to serve solely as a conventional commuter rail station, West Station is designed to eventually serve high-frequency diesel multiple unit service on the inner Worcester Line and on the Grand Junction Railroad.

By July 2016, the state planned to file a Draft Environmental Impact Statement (DEIS) for the project in 2017 and hoped to break ground in 2019. It was then estimated to cost $25 million, to be split between Harvard University (which owns the surrounding land), the state, and a third party (intended to be Boston University pending negotiations). In December 2017, the state announced that the station cost had increased to $95 million, and that it would not open until 2040. In January 2018, Harvard increased its pledge to $50 million, with an additional $8 million incentive to build an interim station.

History

Background

The Boston & Albany Railroad originally had a number of stations in the inner ring of suburbs, including stations at Allston (Cambridge Street) and Cottage Farms (Commonwealth Avenue). No station was built near the split with the Grand Junction Railroad as the Grand Junction did not carry passenger service. A large freight yard, Beacon Park Yard, was ultimately built just west of the split. All stations east of Newtonville were closed around 1962 when much of the main line was reduced from 4 to 2 tracks during the building of the Massachusetts Turnpike. The station closures left Allston and Brighton lacking commuter rail service.

In 1998, a new station in Allston-Brighton began to be considered as part of the Urban Ring planning process. In 2007, the City of Boston allocated $500,000 in funding for the Allston Multimodal Station Study. The study analyzed both commuter rail and DMU local service along the corridor, with potential stops at Faneuil, Market Street, Everett Street, Cambridge Street, West (Ashford Street), and Commonwealth Avenue. The final recommendation, for a commuter rail station at Everett Street with DMU stops added later at the other locations, sparked local controversy but was mostly well received.

In 2009 and 2010, the state negotiated a major agreement with CSX Transportation that involved the purchase of several rail lines, including purchasing the line between Framingham and Worcester. The agreement also included CSX moving its intermodal freight operations from Beacon Park Yard to a new yard in Worcester. The abandonment of Beacon Park Yard allows for an increase in MBTA service on the Framingham/Worcester Line; additionally, the elimination of the single-track bottleneck through the yard opened the possibility for a station to be built in Allston (possibly in conjunction with the Urban Ring project) while still allowing passing tracks. However, with no funding source available, construction of a station was not pursued.

In June 2012, New Balance announced that it would build the Everett Street station, Boston Landing, as part of their Boston Landing development. The station opened on May 22, 2017.

West Station

In October 2013, MassDOT announced a $260 million plan to straighten the Mass Pike through Beacon Park Yard, replacing the existing toll booths with high-speed all-electronic tolling and allowing Harvard University and others to develop land currently cordoned off by the highway and its interchange ramps. The initial plans included the possibility of an 8 or 9-track commuter rail layover yard next to the Worcester main.

In January 2014, MassDOT released its ten-year plan, which included a six-line DMU network called the Indigo Line proposed to be implemented by 2024. This included additional service on the Fairmount Line, the Newburyport/Rockport Line (to Lynn), the Lowell Line (to Anderson RTC), and the Worcester Line (to Riverside), as well as new service from Back Bay to the BCEC on Track 61 and from North Station along the Grand Junction to a new station near Boston University's West Campus. This new West Station would offer connections between the Grand Junction DMU route, the Riverside DMU route, and conventional commuter service on the Worcester Line. It was proposed to attract commercial development to the Beacon Park area, similar to Assembly Station and the Assembly Square development in Somerville, Massachusetts.

However, no dedicated funding source was established for the Indigo Line plans, including West Station. In May 2014, MassDOT announced that the station would not be included in the budget for the Turnpike project, placing it in an uncertain future.

On September 30, 2014, a press conference was held in Beacon Park Yard to announce that the station would be constructed in concert with the Turnpike straightening. The cost of the $25 million station will be split between Harvard University, the state, and a third party to be determined. In March 2015, the Boston Globe revealed that Boston University was to have been the final third; however, this was not finalized before Deval Patrick left office. BU's contribution would be dependent on a promise that automobile and bus traffic would not travel through BU's West Campus to reach the station, and instead use new roads being constructed during the Beacon Park project.  (BU later dropped this demand.)

By 2016, the station was scheduled to begin construction in 2019 and to be completed along with the highway project. Earlier estimates suggested a 3-4 year construction time. State legislators representing communities along the Worcester Line have expressed concern that Boston Landing and West Station would slow down trips for suburban commuters.

In December 2017, the state announced that the station would not be completed until 2040, after the Harvard-owned land has been redeveloped. The projected cost of the station had increased to $95 million by that time due to the addition of a bus transfer level and other scope increases.  In response to a plea from city and state politicians, in January 2018, Harvard University increased its pledge to pay $50 million of the cost, with an additional $8 million incentive to build an early action interim station.  The Turnpike straightening is proceeding regardless due to the deteriorating state of the existing viaduct.

References

External links 

MBTA Commuter Rail stations in Boston
Proposed MBTA Commuter Rail stations